Mercury is a 2018 Indian horror thriller film written and directed by Karthik Subbaraj. It stars an ensemble cast including Prabhu Deva, Sananth Reddy, Remya Nambeesan, Indhuja Ravichandran, Deepak Paramesh, Shashank Purushotham, and Anish Padmanabhan, amongst others. Subbaraj presented the film under his own production banner Stone Bench Creations, whilst Jayantilal Gada of Pen India Limited distributed and co-produced the film. It is about the story of five friends who were terrorised by the ghost of a victim, maimed from mercury poisoning.

Karthik Subbaraj insisted on doing a silent film after being inspired by Pushpaka Vimana (1987). He came up with a script of a film based on Kodaikanal mercury poisoning incident and planned up as a dialogue-less film. It was announced in May 2017, with production began the same month and completed within July 2017. Filmed across Chennai, Pondicherry, Kodaikanal, and Kamuthi, the background music for the film is composed by Santhosh Narayanan, with cinematography handled by Tirru and edited by Vivek Harshan, whereas Kunal Rajan was the sound designer.

The film released on 13 April 2018 worldwide except Tamil Nadu, due to the Tamil Film Producers Council strike, and was released in the state on 20 April 2018, becoming their first Tamil release, after the strike. Since the film has no dialogue, the makers found it easier to distribute and release the film under major territories across India. The film opened to mixed reviews, praising the major technical aspects and the cast performances, but the slow pace of the film met with criticism. The film was screened at the Indian Film Festival of Los Angeles on 12 April 2018, ahead of the worldwide release.

Synopsis
Maimed from mercury poisoning, five longtime friends come together for a high school reunion on a farm. Then, Michael plans to propose to Meera and calls her and his friends, and they go on a night drive at a place Michael proposes to Meera; she accepts. Afterwards, while driving the other four friends home, Meera nearly runs over a dog after the other four were messing with the headlights. Because of this, she was temporarily blinded. Somehow, the friends accidentally end up dragging a blind man to death when they swerved to avoid his dog. After dumping his body, the friends are terrorized by the man's ghost in mysterious ways. When the ghost had killed the guys in the group and tries to kill Meera as well, then she reveals that she is deaf and did not recognize the hitting of the car. The ghost, having realized he killed a bunch of innocents thinking they were the corporate factory owners who were responsible for the occurring mercury poisoning, shares his story of being blinded due to mercury poisoning and one night was walking his dog when the leash accidentally got stuck to the friends' car and got dragged until he hit a headstone and succumbs to his injury. Despite the mishaps that happened, the ghost forgives and spares her, not before possessing her to see his wife one last time and gives his hearing capacity to the Meera upon leaving her body as he burns down the factory.

Cast 
 Prabhu Deva as a blind person who has fallen victim to mercury poisoning
 Sananth as Michael
 Indhuja Ravichandran as Meera
 Anish Padmanabhan as Vinay
 Deepak Paramesh
 Shashank Purushotham
 Gajaraj
 Remya Nambeesan as Prabhu Deva's wife (cameo appearance)
Special appearances in The Mercury Song
 Krithika Babu
 Adithya Shivpink

Production

Development 
Karthik Subbaraj wanted to work on a silent film after his debut short film Black and White, which featured no dialogue, was critically raved upon release. Inspired by the 1987 film Pushpaka Vimana, Subbaraj wanted to develop a full-length dialogue-less feature film, after making his directorial debut with Pizza, but he could not do so due to circumstances; instead, he chose to direct two more projects, including Jigarthanda and Iraivi. When his speculated project with Dhanush, was postponed indefinitely, due to Dhanush prioritising his commitments on The Extraordinary Journey of the Fakir, Subbaraj had much time working on the proposed silent film, with a script being based on the Kodaikanal mercury poisoning in 2001, served as an idea. He found the core plot of the story as "gripping", while the proposed idea of making it as a silent film made more interesting. After finishing the first draft, it made possible to make the film as a silent thriller, with the core team too opined the same. He felt that the mark of a good screenplay is it needs very few dialogues, so he wanted to take up the challenge of writing a good screenplay without any dialogues, which led him to develop the script, further expressing that filming the project as a silent film gave it more freedom to play up other aspects to amp up the film's "thrill factor".

Casting 
Prabhu Deva, was reportedly playing the character of a blind person who fell victim to mercury poisoning. He called his role as "unique" and "unusual" comparing with his previous films, where the script demanded a dance or comedy sequences. Along with himself, the film featured five other young actors, Sananth Reddy, Deepak Paramesh, Indhuja Ravichandran, Anish Padmanabhan and Shashank Purushotham in pivotal roles. Excluding Shashank, four of the pivotal members were known to Subbaraj as they earlier worked in the projects which he bankrolled, whilst Shashank, a theatre-actor whose debut feature film Shuddhi, received acclaim, was not related to Subbaraj. Also being the only Kannada actor in the cast, he revealed that it took time to understand the Tamil language. The team begun rehearsals for their roles during April 2017, before production began, and was completed within 20–25 days.

Subbaraj opined that in a silent film, visuals, music and sound deserved much importance in the script. So he decided to bring acclaimed technicians to work on the project in order to give a unique experience. Cinematographer Tirru, stated that "When Karthik Subbaraj narrated the story, he didn't tell me that it would be a silent film" but one of "four protagonists who are both hearing and speech impaired". Tirru initially wondered how such people could communicate, until Subbaraj told him the film would not have dialogues. Kunal Rajan was a part of the technical crew, whereas Subbaraj's norm composer Santhosh Narayanan, joined the film to score music for the background. The team also roped in twin stunt choreographers Anbariv, as Subbaraj demanded that the film has event-based stunt sequences which was considered to be both "realistic" and "artistic".

Filming 
The film was formally announced in May 2017 in Chennai. Within a month, the makers have completed shooting 60% of the film by June 2017, with Chennai, Pondicherry and Kumbakonam served as the primary locations for the film. In late June 2017, the makers headed to Kamuthi for the final schedule of the film, with Remya Nambeesan being a part of this schedule. As most of the film being shot indoors, Tirru used not to keep the camera steady as not to trigger visual fatigue, where the camera is placed, either from the point of view of the character or as a third person. The team also filmed a scene within a single shot stating that "To shoot that scene, we had to keep moving the cameras, so Karthik, Anbariv (stunt directors) and I decided to have it as a single shot. The situation too warranted it as cutting it into different shots wouldn't convey the intensity of the scene. The idea was to make the audience understand the characters' stand and make them feel claustrophobic." The entire shooting of the film was completed within July 2017.

Themes 
The film is based on the Kodaikanal mercury poisoning incident happened in 2001, where hundreds of workers were allegedly exposed to toxic mercury vapours at the Hindustan Lever factory in Kodaikanal, Tamil Nadu, which is now defunct. Subbaraj wanted to develop the script based on the incident, for the film which is found to be "gripping". He stated that the film talks about corporate exploitation in small towns, further adding that the incident in a way inspired him to make this film. Karthik Subbaraj expressed its purpose of making it as a silent film, since the story and the script demanded it. While Kaarthekeyen Santhanam of Stone Bench Films added that "the move is a reason why a content-driven concept, to fit both parameters. We found the idea of producing a film without dialogues very exciting as well as Karthik's story is much interesting".

Music 
Santhosh Narayanan, Subbaraj's norm composer joined the technical team, by composing music for the film's background. Though the film does not feature any songs, a promotional song for the film "The Mercury Song" composed by Mithoon, lyrics penned by Sayeed Quadri and sung by Haricharan and Gajendra Verma was released on 15 March 2018, in order to promote the film's Hindi version. Santhosh also composed a song "Oru Mara Nizhalil", recorded by Sathyaprakash and lyrics written by Vivek. Released on 1 May 2018, it is a montage song was picturised on the romance between the characters Michael (Sananth) and Meera (Indhuja) in the film. Though the instrumental version of this song had appeared in the film, as the background score, while the song was used only for promotional purposes.

Release 
Karthik Subbaraj initially tweeted that the film will be scheduled for theatrical release on 13 April 2018, coinciding with the eve of Tamil New Year's Day and also the date matched with that of Friday the 13th. The theatrical trailer of the film was launched on 7 March 2018 to positive response from viewers and audiences alike. Since the film has no dialogues, the team found it easier to distribute and release the film in different regions under the same title. Rakshit Shetty's Paramvah Studios and Pushkar Films distributed the film in Karnataka, with KFC Entertainment acquired the rights to release the film in Andhra Pradesh and Telangana territories. Pen India Limited acquired the global rights of the film. The trailer of the film was scheduled to release on 5 April, but in order to show solidarity towards the statewide bandh due to Kaveri River water dispute, the makers postponed the trailer launch, although it was launched on 10 April by prominent celebrities.

The film released worldwide on 13 April 2018, excluding Tamil Nadu, due to the strike organised by Tamil Film Producers Council against the digital service providers owing to the hike in Virtual Print Fee. A day, before the official release date in India, the film was screened at the Indian Film Festival of Los Angeles on 12 April 2018. The same day, the makers hosted a special screening in Mumbai, with the presence of actors Tamannaah and Anant Mahadevan among other celebrities joining the event. The film was leaked online through pirated sites, despite not having a scheduled release in Tamil Nadu, with Prabhu Deva and the film's cast urging fans not to watch pirated versions. Mercury became the first Tamil release after the 48-day strike held by Producer's Council. The film opened to a wide release in Tamil Nadu on 20 April 2018. Celebrities such as Venkat Prabhu and Rajinikanth praised the film's team and the crew.

Reception 
The film opened to mixed reviews praising the performances of the cast, cinematography and direction, whereas critics pointed out the film's slow pace despite its minimal runtime.

The Times of India, chief critic Reza Noorani gave three out of five stars saying "There are no big scares that 'Mercury' delivers. Instead, it unravels at its own pace which is not perfect at all times." Saibal Chatterjee of NDTV, stated that the film is no more than "a disjointed drama that uses conventions of the slasher flick and the horror film in order to spin a none-too-scary yarn that oftentimes borders on the unintentionally funny"; rather stated that "the film ventures into the territory that A Quiet Place occupies - the destructive force in Mercury turns out to be a figure that waits for the stimuli of sound to line up and pounce on its targets". Behindwoods gave three out of five stars and stated "Mercury is technically sound and convincingly silent! It could have worked well with better engagement". Y. Sunita Chowdary of The Hindu stated that the film has its fair share of "chills" and "thrills". Udita Jhunjhunwala of Firstpost pointed the story as one of the major flaws of the film, stating that "the story just does not stitch together". Indiaglitz rated two-and-a-half out of five and stated "if you fancy an experimental film with uniformly good performances and novelty in story telling, the film is a must watch".

Anisha Javeri of IndieWire stated "Though the historical backdrop could have made for a compelling metaphor, the clichés and heavy-handedness of “Mercury” ultimately outweigh the novelty of its premise, while its sloppy social relevance angle does more to confound than clarify the disaster in question", further adding that "Mercury may be remembered as the first silent thriller in Indian cinema, but it’s far from the heart-stopper we’re looking for." Manoj Kumar R. of The Indian Express gave three-and-a-half out of five stars "Karthik Subbaraj's plot has a few gaps and he also uses the regular narrative techniques of the horror genre to create the moments of shock. However, the overall impact of Mercury on a viewer is very effective, encouraging us to brush aside the shortcomings." Sajin Srijith of The New Indian Express gave a rating of 4 out of 5 and added "Karthik Subbaraj's Mercury is audacious, technically-impressive, and an experiment filled with delightful surprises".

Nandini Ramanath of Scroll.in had reviewed "Subbaraj tries to dress up a routine horror film with a social theme, but fortunately, the director has enough tricks up his sleeve to make the scary portions work." Arnab Bannerjee of Deccan Chronicle gave one-and-a-half five stars and stated "Karthik Subbaraj tries to juggle a thriller horror story with a not-so-original twist." Baradwaj Rangan of Film Companion South opined that Subbaraj ended up making not just a "thriller", but an "emotional horror-drama with a touch of eco-activism". Sowmya Rajendran of The News Minute stated "The film breaks out of the formula horror film and attempts something new although the characters don't stand out."

Footnotes

References

External links 

 Mercury at Rotten Tomatoes

2018 horror films
2018 horror thriller films
Films about blind people in India
Films directed by Karthik Subbaraj
Films scored by Santhosh Narayanan
Films set in ghost towns
Films without speech
Indian horror thriller films
Sign-language films